Sarah Louise Joseph is an Australian human rights scholar. She is the Director of the Castan Centre for Human Rights Law at Monash University, a position she has held since 2005.

Early life and education
Joseph holds a Bachelor of Arts and a Bachelor of Laws from the University of Sydney, a Master of Laws from the University of Cambridge, and a Ph.D. in Law from Monash University.

Career
Joseph is a legal academic and commentator, specialising in the areas of human rights and constitutional law. She has published Corporations and Transnational Human Rights Litigation (Hart 2004), and co-authored The International Covenant on Civil and Political Rights: Cases, Commentary and Materials (OUP, 2nd ed, 2004), Federal Constitutional Law: A Contemporary View (Thompson, 2nd ed, 2006), A Handbook on the Individual Complaints Procedures of the UN (OMCT, 2006), The International Covenant on Civil and Political Rights: Cases, Commentary and Materials (OUP, 3rd ed, 2013), and Federal Constitutional Law: A Contemporary View (Thompson, 5th ed, 2019).

References 

Australian legal scholars
Academic staff of Monash University
Living people
Monash Law School alumni
Sydney Law School alumni
Alumni of the University of Cambridge
Year of birth missing (living people)